Kaddish is a 1924 German silent drama film directed by Adolf E. Licho and starring Lia Eibenschütz, Ilka Grüning, and Rudolf Lettinger. Set in Poland, it takes its name from the Jewish prayer Kaddish.

The film's sets were designed by the art directors Walter Röhrig and Robert Herlth.

Cast

References

Bibliography

External links

1924 films
Films of the Weimar Republic
German silent feature films
Films directed by Adolf E. Licho
German black-and-white films
1924 drama films
German drama films
Silent drama films
1920s German films
1920s German-language films